The Arabic chat alphabet, Arabizi, Franco-Arabic, refer to the Romanized alphabets for informal Arabic dialects in which Arabic script is transcribed or encoded into a combination of Latin script and Arabic numerals. These informal chat alphabets were originally used primarily by youth in the Arab world in very informal settings—especially for communicating over the Internet or for sending messages via cellular phones—though use is not necessarily restricted by age anymore and these chat alphabets have been used in other media such as advertising.

These chat alphabets differ from more formal and academic Arabic transliteration systems, in that they use numerals and multigraphs instead of diacritics for letters such as qāf or ḍād that do not exist in the basic Latin script (ASCII), and in that what is being transcribed is an informal dialect and not Standard Arabic. These Arabic chat alphabets also differ from each other, as each is influenced by the particular phonology of the Arabic dialect being transcribed and the orthography of the dominant European language in the area—typically the language of the former colonists, and typically either French or English.

Because of their widespread use, including in public advertisements by large multinational companies, large players in the online industry like Google and Microsoft have introduced tools that convert text written in Arabish to Arabic (Google Translate and Microsoft Translator). Add-ons for Mozilla Firefox and Chrome also exist (Panlatin and ARABEASY Keyboard ). The Arabic chat alphabet is never used in formal settings and is rarely, if ever, used for long communications.

History 
During the last decades of the 20th century, Western text-based communication technologies, such as mobile phone text messaging, the World Wide Web, email, bulletin board systems, IRC, and instant messaging became increasingly prevalent in the Arab world. Most of these technologies originally permitted the use of the Latin script only, and some still lack support for displaying Arabic script. As a result, Arabic-speaking users frequently transliterate Arabic text into Latin script when using these technologies to communicate.
To handle those Arabic letters that do not have an approximate phonetic equivalent in the Latin script, numerals and other characters were appropriated. For example, the numeral "3" is used to represent the Arabic letter —note the choice of a visually similar character, with the numeral resembling a mirrored version of the Arabic letter. Many users of mobile phones and computers use Arabish even though their system is capable of displaying Arabic script. This may be due to a lack of an appropriate keyboard layout for Arabic, or because users are already more familiar with the QWERTY or AZERTY keyboard layout.

Online communication systems, such as IRC, bulletin board systems, and blogs, are often run on systems or over protocols that do not support code pages or alternate character sets. Thus, the Arabic chat alphabet has become commonplace. It can be seen even in domain names, like Qal3ah.

According to one 2020 paper based on a survey done in and around Nazareth, there is now "a high degree of normativization or standardisation in Arabizi orthography."

Comparison table 
Because of the informal nature of this system, there is no single "correct" or "official" usage. There may be some overlap in the way various letters are transliterated.

Most of the characters in the system make use of the Latin character (as used in English and French) that best approximates phonetically the Arabic letter that one would otherwise use (for example,  corresponds to b). Regional variations in the pronunciation of an Arabic letter can also produce some variation in its transliteration (e.g.  might be transliterated as j by a speaker of the Levantine dialect, or as g by a speaker of the Egyptian dialect).

Those letters that do not have a close phonetic approximation in the Latin script are often expressed using numerals or other characters, so that the numeral graphically approximates the Arabic letter that one would otherwise use (e.g.  is represented using the numeral 3 because the latter looks like a vertical reflection of the former).

Since many letters are distinguished from others solely by a dot above or below the main portion of the character, the transliterations of these letters frequently use the same letter or number with an apostrophe added before or after (e.g. '3 is used to represent ).

é, è, ch, and dj are most likely to be used in regions where French is the primary non-Arabic language. dj is especially used in Algerian Arabic.
It is the more traditional way of spelling the letter for both cases.
In Iraq, and sometimes in the Persian Gulf, this may be used to transcribe . In Egypt, it is instead used for transcribing  (which can be a reduction of ). In Israel, it is used to transcribe , as in "ﺭﻣﺎت ﭼﺎﻥ" (Ramat Gan) or "چيميل يافيت" (Gimel Yafit).
Only used in Morocco to transliterate Spanish .
Depending on the region, different letters may be used for the same phoneme.
The dollar sign is only used in Jordan.
This use for h is also found in Morocco.
Capitalized D and T may be used in Lebanon.
The number 8 is used for  only in Lebanon.
The letters t and d are used for the pronunciations , respectively.
Used in a Palestinian dialect where the letter is sometimes pronounced .

Examples 
Each of the different varieties of Arabic chat alphabets is influenced by the particular phonology of the Arabic dialect being transcribed and the orthography of the dominant European language in the area—typically the language of the former colonists. Below are some examples of Arabic chat alphabet varieties.

Egyptian Arabic
The frequent use of y and w to represent ى and و demonstrates the influence of English orthography on the romanization of Egyptian Arabic.

Additionally, the letter qāf (ق) is usually pronounced as a glottal stop, like a Hamza (ء) in Metropolitan (Cairene) Egyptian Arabic—unlike Standard Arabic in which it represents a voiceless uvular stop. Therefore, in Egyptian Arabizi, the numeral 2 can represent either a Hamza or a qāf pronounced as a glottal stop.

Levantine Arabic

Moroccan Arabic
The use of ch to represent ش demonstrates the influence of French orthography on the romanization of Moroccan Arabic or Darija. French became the primary European language in Morocco as a result of French colonialism.

One of the characteristics of Franco-Arabic as it's used to transcribe Darija is the presence of long consonant clusters that are typically unorthodox in other languages. These clusters represents the deletion of short vowels and the syllabification of medial consonants in the phonology of Darija, a feature shared with and derived from Amazigh languages.

Gulf Arabic
 Spoken along the Persian Gulf coasts of Kuwait, Bahrain, Qatar, Oman, UAE and eastern Saudi Arabia

Iraqi Arabic
 Baghdadi Arabic

Palestinian Arabic

Sudanese Arabic

Chadian Arabic
 Shuwa Arabic spoken in N'Djamena, Chad.

Criticism 

The phenomenon of writing Arabic with these improvised chat alphabets has drawn sharp rebuke from a number of different segments of Arabic-speaking communities. While educators and members of the intelligentsia mourn the deterioration and degradation of the standard, literary, academic language, conservative Muslims, as well as Pan-Arabists and some Arab-nationalists, view the Arabic Chat Alphabet as a detrimental form of Westernization. Arabic chat alphabets emerged amid a growing trend among Arab youth, from Morocco to Iraq, to incorporate former colonial languages—especially English and French—into Arabic through code switching or as a form of slang. These improvised chat alphabets are used to replace Arabic script, and this raises concerns regarding the preservation of the quality of the language.

See also 

 Arablish
 Arabic alphabet
 Varieties of Arabic
 Arabic phonology
 Arabic transliteration
 Romanization of Syriac
 Arabist
 Fingilish the same idea with Persian
 l33t
 Translit
 Volapuk encoding—the same idea with Cyrillic
 Yamli, a tool for real time Arabic transliteration
 Greeklish, a similar phenomenon in Greek

References 

 

 

ASCII
Chat alphabet
Instant messaging
Nonstandard spelling
Chat alphabet
Internet slang